Music of Hair is Andrew Bird's first released album. The album came out in 1996. The tracks featured were written in Bird's early twenties, and the album was released when he was 23. The album features contributions from musicians Colin Bunn, Dave Dieckmann, Kat Eggleston, Al Ehrich, Kevin O'Donnell; and, James "Jimbo" Mathus, Katharine Whalen and Chris Phillips from Squirrel Nut Zippers.

The title of the album is a reference to Galway Kinnell's poem, "Wait". This poem is also used for the lyrics in the song "Wait," on the album Oh! The Grandeur.

Track listing

Other appearances

 Re-recorded versions of the songs "Nuthinduan Waltz" and "Pathetique" are found on the album Thrills.

References

Andrew Bird albums
1996 debut albums